D1 (Д1) is a 4-car diesel multiple unit train built in 1960s-1980s by Hungarian producer Ganz-MAVAG for Soviet railways.

D1M

In 2012, Moldovan Railway and Electroputere VFU company in Romania started a complete modernization program for D1 units (as D1M), with most of the parts changed, including installation of a new engine by Volvo Penta. In addition, the refurbished units were equipped with air conditioning system, wireless internet access points, and disability access ramps.

Gallery

Exterior

Interior

Passenger's interior

Driver's cabin

In fiction
Mikhail, a character from Robot Trains, is based on D1 diesel-multiple unit.

See also
 History of rail transport in Russia

References

External links
 

Diesel multiple units of Russia
Ganz-Mavag multiple units
Diesel multiple units of Ukraine